Edinanci Fernandes da Silva (born 23 August 1976) is a judoka from Brazil, who won the gold medal in the half heavyweight division (– 78 kg) at the Pan American Games. A resident of São Paulo born in Sousa, Paraíba, she represented her country at four consecutive Summer Olympics, starting in 1996 in Atlanta, Georgia.

Edinanci is born intersex. In the mid-1990s she had surgery, in order to live and compete as a woman.

References

External links
 
 
 Profile 

1976 births
Intersex sportspeople
Intersex women
Living people
Judoka at the 1996 Summer Olympics
Judoka at the 2000 Summer Olympics
Judoka at the 2004 Summer Olympics
Judoka at the 2008 Summer Olympics
Judoka at the 1999 Pan American Games
Judoka at the 2003 Pan American Games
Judoka at the 2007 Pan American Games
Olympic judoka of Brazil
Brazilian female judoka
Pan American Games gold medalists for Brazil
Pan American Games bronze medalists for Brazil
Pan American Games medalists in judo
Medalists at the 1999 Pan American Games
Medalists at the 2003 Pan American Games
Medalists at the 2007 Pan American Games